Edward Roussell (1901 – death unknown), nicknamed "Jimsey" or "Jimpsey", was an American Negro league outfielder from 1929 to 1931.

A native of New Orleans, Louisiana, Roussell made his Negro leagues debut in 1929 with the Nashville Elite Giants and Birmingham Black Barons. He went on to play for the Memphis Red Sox the following season, and finished his career back with Nashville in 1931.

References

External links
 and Baseball-Reference Black Baseball stats and Seamheads

1901 births
Date of birth missing
Place of death missing
Year of death missing
Birmingham Black Barons players
Memphis Red Sox players
Nashville Elite Giants players
Baseball outfielders
Baseball players from New Orleans